Black Sky: The Race For Space is a 2004 Discovery Channel documentary about Space Ship One, and how a small team backed by Paul Allen achieved human suborbital spaceflight and won the Ansari X Prize.  It contains insights about how the rocketplane was built, the challenges they faced when they flew it, the vision of Burt Rutan about the future of this technology (tier two and three), and his thoughts about NASA and government. It won a Peabody Award in 2004.

See also

 Orphans of Apollo, 2008 documentary on the tentative plan to privatize the space station Mir
 How to Make a Spaceship, 2016 book by Julian Guthrie about the Ansari X Prize

References

External links
 
 Black Sky: The Race For Space at Vulcan Productions

Ansari X Prize
Discovery Channel original programming
Scaled Composites
Mojave Air and Space Port
Space tourism
Commercial spaceflight
Documentary films about outer space
Documentary films about the space program of the United States
Peabody Award-winning broadcasts